Al Ghubaiba is a rapid transit station on the Green Line of the Dubai Metro in Dubai, UAE.

The station opened as part of the Green Line on 9 September 2011.

Location
The station is located in Al Shindagha, Bur Dubai, traditionally the historic centre of Dubai. It is near the junction of 51 Road & Al Ghubaiba Road, with a number of entrances/exits. It is close to Al Ghubaiba Bus Station (which has intercity services including to Abu Dhabi and Sharjah) and City Centre Al Shindagha, as well as Dubai Creek. It is also close to several bus services.

Station layout
Al Ghubaiba Metro Station has 2 side platforms and two tracks on each of its 2 floors.

Platform layout

References

External links
 

Railway stations in the United Arab Emirates opened in 2011
Dubai Metro stations